Guinea sent a single athlete, Ahmed Barry, to compete at the 2008 Summer Paralympics in Beijing, People's Republic of China. He entered the men's 200 m T46 as his only event, but was a non-starter.

Athletics

Men's track

See also
Guinea at the Paralympics
Guinea at the 2008 Summer Olympics

References

External links
International Paralympic Committee
Beijing 2008 Paralympic Games Official Site

Nations at the 2008 Summer Paralympics
2008
Summer Paralympics